Nəbilər is a village in the Shusha District of Azerbaijan.

History 
The village was captured by the Armenian forces on 15 May 1991 during the First Nagorno-Karabakh War and was made part of Shushi Province of the self-proclaimed Republic of Artsakh.

During the 2020 Nagorno-Karabakh war, Azerbaijani troops recaptured the village.

References 

Populated places in Shusha District